Frederick Ritchie Bechdolt (July 27, 1874 – April 13, 1950) (also known as Fred or Beck) was an American journalist, Western fiction writer, and pioneer member of the Carmel art colony. He was a prolific writer, publishing over 30 books and countless articles in his lifetime.

Early life 

Bechdolt was born on July 27, 1874, in Mercersburg, Pennsylvania. He was the son of Adolph Frederick Bechdolt (1846–1938) and Jean Ritchie (1845–1896). He went to University of North Dakota (1892–1895), and received his Bachelor of Arts at the University of Washington in 1896, where his father was a German professor. He married Adele V. Fortier (Hale) (1873–1945) on December 9, 1908, and had two children during their marriage. She was married before, in 1895, to Lester Marsh Hale (1869–1941), and had three children, one of whom was married to Carmel builder Levon "Lee" Estell Gottfried (1896–1968). Adele's sister was Kathryn Jane Fortier (1879–1932) was married to William Lorenzo Overstreet (1871–1941). 

After college, in 1897, Bechdolt went on a series of adventures that included becoming a placer miner in the Klondike Gold Rush where he drove a dog sled. He spent time in Death Valley and the Mojave Desert, where he lived on and a ranch and explored mines. In Washington, he helped drill the Cascade Tunnel for the railroad. He used many of these experiences to write his Western stories.

Career

Bechdolt was a prolific writer, publishing over 30 books and countless articles in his lifetime. His writing covered a wide range of topics, from travel and adventure to Western stories. These stories were published in McClure's, Collier's, The Saturday Evening Post, and The Popular Magazine. 

In 1900, Bechdolt became a journalist and worked as a reporter for The Seattle Star, Los Angeles Times, and The San Francisco Call. He did research at San Quentin State and Alcatraz prisons and took up the cause for prisoners' rights. 

In 1906, he was one of the earliest writers to visit Carmel-by-the-Sea, California. This is where he met writer James Hopper and the two became good friends, often entertaining with some of Carmel's bohemians like musician Mabel Gray Lachmund. Bechdolt and his wife moved to Carmel in 1907, and built a home in the Eighty Acres tract of Carmel where he was a neighbor of writer George Sterling. Together, Bechdolt and Hopper wrote the fictional novel 9009 (1908) about the condition of American prisons and the need for reform.

Bechdolt had a strong interest in the Forest Theater. In July 1915, Bechdolt played Serra in Perry Newberry's play Junípero Serra at the Forest Theater, a historical pageant focusing on the life of Father Junípero Serra. The play was a big success and was performed again at the Panama–Pacific International Exposition. He was an actor in other plays, including The Brink Of Silence, (1925) and The Thrice Promised Bride (1923). 

Bechdolt was an early member of Carmel's Abalone League, along Edward Kuster, Charley Van Riper, James Hopper, John Hillaiard, Ernest Schweninger, Talbert Josselyn, R. C. Smith, and Winsor Josselyn. In addition, he served as postmaster, city council member, and police commissioner.

Bechdolt's book Riot at Red Water (1944) was a book listed in the List of Armed Services Editions, which were small paperback books of fiction and nonfiction that were distributed in the American military during World War II.

Works

  {{columns-list|colwidth=22em| 
 9009 (1908) (with James Hopper)
 The Hard Rock Man (1910) First published as a short story in the Saturday Evening Post in 1908, next serialized as Tom Morton: A Story of the Hard Rock Men in the Saturday Evening Post in 1910
 When The West Was Young (1922, "Century") fact-based stories:
 How Death Valley Was Named 
 Joaquin Murieta 
 Tombstone 
 Tombstone's Wild Oats 
 The Show-Down 
 The Passing Of John Ringo 
 John Slaughter's Way
 Cochise
 One Against Many 
 The Overland Mail 
 Boot-Hill
 The Pot o' Gold (1917
 Thieves' Gold (1918)
 The Hard Rock Breed (1918)
 Tales of the Old-timers (1924) fact-based stories
 The Warriors of the Pecos 
 The Warriors of the Canadian 
 The Law-Bringers 
 Tascosa  Adobe Walls  Red Blood and White The First Cowboy The Forgotten Expedition to Santa Fé  The Texans  The Most Consummate Villain Cassidy and the Wild Bunch  The Last of the Open Ranges Mutiny: an Adventure Story (1927, Chelsea House) 
 Giants of the Old West (1930)
 Riders of San Pedro (1931)
 Horse Thief Trail (1932)
 The Tree of Death (1937)
 Danger On The Border (1940) 
 Riot at Red Water (1944)
}}

Works from periodicals
  

Non fiction
 One Against Many (1921 Mid-June, Adventure) 
 Cochise (1921 July 1, Adventure)
 The First Cowboy (1922 Nov 30, Adventure)

Death
Bechdolt died at the Carmel Cumminity hospital on April 13, 1950, at the age of 75. Funeral services were held at the T. A. Dorney Funeral Chapel in Monterey and Requiem mass at the Carmel Mission. 

Legacy
Bechdolt's legacy as a writer and adventurer endures to this day. His books are still in print, and his spirit of adventure and exploration continues to inspire new generations of travelers and adventurers. Several books have been turned into films, including The Pot o' Gold (1917), The Hard Rock Breed (1918), and Thieves' Gold'' (1918).

See also
 Timeline of Carmel-by-the-Sea, California

References

External links

  Bechdolt, Frederick R.
 

1874 births
1950 deaths
People from Carmel-by-the-Sea, California
People from Monterey, California
People from Pennsylvania
20th-century American novelists
20th-century American essayists
20th-century American short story writers
American mystery writers